The Morris Island Conservation Area is operated by the Mississippi Valley Conservation Authority.

Located on the Ottawa River near Fitzroy Harbour, the Morris Island Conservation Area consists of 47 hectares of forested woodlands and wetlands. It allows for hiking, picnicking, canoeing (within the bay areas of the island), and fishing (including accessible fishing platforms).

References

External links
 Morris Island Conservation Area on the Mississippi Valley Conservation Authority website

Conservation areas in Ontario